Haven is the eleventh studio album by American power metal band Kamelot, released in North America on May 5, 2015 and world-wide on May 8. The album is produced by Sascha Paeth and mastered by Jacob Hansen. The cover and artwork were created by Stefan Heilemann and the additional art/layout were done by Gustavo Sazes. It features guest appearances by Alissa White-Gluz, Troy Donockley and Charlotte Wessels.  It is also the band's first album with Napalm Records.

It is the final studio album to feature Casey Grillo on drums.

Track listing

Personnel
Credits for Haven adapted from liner notes.

Kamelot
 Tommy Karevik – lead vocals
 Thomas Youngblood – guitars, backing vocals, orchestral arrangements
 Sean Tibbetts – bass
 Oliver Palotai – keyboards, orchestral arrangements
 Casey Grillo – drums

Additional musicians
 Alissa White-Gluz – female vocals on "Liar Liar (Wasteland Monarchy)", grunts on "Liar Liar (Wasteland Monarchy)" and "Revolution"
 Troy Donockley – tin whistle on "Under Grey Skies"
 Charlotte Wessels – female vocals on "Under Grey Skies", backing vocals on "Beautiful Apocalypse"
 Cloudy Yang – backing vocals (track 12)
 Sascha Paeth – additional guitars
 Dennis Hornung – contrabass (1)
 Miro – additional keyboards (4, 8), engineering (additional)

Choir
 Cloudy Yang, Grazia Sposito, Herbie Langhans, Thomas Rettke

Production
 Jacob Hansen – mastering
 Stefan Heilemann – artwork, layout
 Gustavo Sazes – additional artwork, layout
 Jim Morris – recording, engineering (drums)
 Andrew Boullianne – recording, engineering (assistant) (drums)
 Philip Collodetti – engineering (additional)
 Olaf Reitmeier – engineering (additional)
 Tim Tronckoe – photography
 Nina Lahtinen – clothes
 Ville Juurikkala – photography (Troy Donockley)

Charts

References

2015 albums
Kamelot albums